Taishin (written: 太信 or 泰臣) is a masculine Japanese given name. Notable people with the name include:

, Japanese kickboxer and karateka
, Japanese footballer

Japanese masculine given names